Lesego Senokwane (born 24 May 1997) is a South African cricketer. He made his Twenty20 cricket debut for North West in the 2016 Africa T20 Cup on 2 September 2016. In September 2018, he was named in North West's squad for the 2018 Africa T20 Cup. In September 2019, he was named in North West's squad for the 2019–20 CSA Provincial T20 Cup. In April 2021, he was named in North West's squad, ahead of the 2021–22 cricket season in South Africa.

References

External links
 

1997 births
Living people
South African cricketers
North West cricketers
People from Klerksdorp